Ab Khar Zahreh or Ab Kharzahreh may refer to:
 Ab Kharzahreh, Andika
 Ab Kharzahreh, Behbahan